Umlena is a village in the municipality of Pehčevo, North Macedonia.

Demographics
According to the 2002 census, the village had a total of 354 inhabitants. Ethnic groups in the village include:

Macedonians 354

References

Villages in Pehčevo Municipality